QT Hotels & Resorts, or QT, is a boutique hotel accommodation and hospitality provider that operates in Australia and New Zealand. Established in 2011, the brand currently operates ten hotels and resorts.

QT is a subsidiary of the ASX-listed Event Hospitality and Entertainment, a corporation that owns and operates brands in the entertainment, hospitality and leisure sectors, mainly within Australasia.

History
The brand was established in 2011, with its first hotel QT Gold Coast. The flagship location, QT Sydney operates inside two of Sydney's historical buildings, the Sydney State Theatre and the Gowings building, both of which opened their doors in 1929. The hotel chain is known internationally for its interaction with art, which is integrated into the overall hotel design.

EVENT's success with Rydges Hotels & Resorts enabled the company to have a large market share of four-star accommodation with-in Australia and New Zealand. Therefore, parent company, Event Hospitality and Entertainment, since expanded into the luxurious accommodation market, by creating QT. The brand has opened nine hotels and resorts in two countries in the span of seven years.

Hotels

Australia 

Australian Capital Territory
 QT Canberra
New South Wales
 QT Bondi
 QT Newcastle .
 QT Sydney
Queensland
 QT Gold Coast
South Australia
 QT Adelaide – under development.
Western Australia
 QT Perth
Victoria
 QT Melbourne

New Zealand 
 QT Auckland 
 QT Queenstown 
 QT Wellington

References

Holding companies of Australia
Hotel chains in Australia